Ustaz Muhammad Fawwaz Mohamad Jan is a Member of Parliament for Permatang Pauh, Penang who won in the 2022 Malaysian general election.

Election results

References 

Living people
21st-century Malaysian politicians
People from Penang
Members of the 15th Malaysian Parliament
Malaysian Islamic Party politicians
Al-Azhar University alumni
1983 births